Ouham-Pendé is one of the 16 prefectures of the Central African Republic. Its capital is Bozoum. The region contains several ghost towns such as Goroumo, Beogombo Deux and Paoua due to government forces ransacking them and armed bandits killing all the male inhabitants over the years from 2005 to 2008.

In the north it has a border with Cameroon and Chad. In the south is the prefecture Ombella-Mpoko, in the south-west the prefecture Nana-Mambéré and in the east the prefecture Ouham.

Notes

 
Prefectures of the Central African Republic